(8 December 1931 – 21 September 2011) was a Japanese actor. He began his career on stage, beginning his film career in 1957.

Filmography
 Pale Flower (1964)
 Keiho (1999)
 Tsuribaka Nisshi 13: Hama-chan Kiki Ippatsu! (2002)
 Drugstore Girl (2003)

Television
 Aikotoba ha Yūki (2000)
 Chūshingura 1/47 (2001)
 Aikurushii (2005)

Honour
Order of the Rising Sun, 4th Class, Gold Rays with Rosette (2006)

References

External links

1931 births
2011 deaths
Japanese male stage actors
Japanese male film actors
Japanese male television actors
People from Okazaki, Aichi
Recipients of the Order of the Rising Sun, 4th class